I'm Not So Tough is the third studio album by American country music singer Mindy McCready. It was released on BNA Records in 1999. This album peaked at #17 on the US country charts and sold 144,000 copies. The album included the single "All I Want Is Everything". The track "Thunder and Roses" was later covered by Pam Tillis on her 2001 album of the same name. "Take Me Apart" was also covered by Tina Arena in 2004. The album was issued in the United Kingdom with three bonus tracks, including the single "One in a Million". The song "I'm Not So Tough" was a cover of the debut single of Dutch singer Ilse DeLange, recorded in 1998. It was her final album for the BNA label.

Track listing

Personnel

 Al Anderson – six-string bass guitar, 12-string electric guitar, acoustic guitar
 Eddie Bayers – drums, percussion
 Mike Brignardello – bass guitar
 Larry Byrom – acoustic guitar
 Kim Carnes – background vocals
 Paulinho da Costa – percussion
 Glen Duncan – fiddle
 Thom Flora – background vocals
 Shannon Forrest – drums
 Larry Franklin – fiddle
 Paul Franklin – dobro, steel guitar
 Wes Hightower – background vocals
 Carl Jackson – background vocals
 Carolyn Dawn Johnson – background vocals
 Jeff King – electric guitar
 Paul Leim – drums, percussion
 Randy McCormick – Hammond organ, synthesizer
 Mindy McCready – lead vocals
 Liana Manis – background vocals
 Brent Mason – electric guitar
 Steve Nathan – piano
 Jamie O'Neal – background vocals
 Matt Rollings – Hammond organ, piano
 Brent Rowan – electric guitar
 John Wesley Ryles – background vocals
 Leslie Satcher – background vocals
 Lisa Silver – background vocals
 Michael Spriggs – acoustic guitar
 Chris Stone – recorder
 Biff Watson – acoustic guitar
 Lonnie Wilson – drums
 Glenn Worf – bass guitar

Chart performance

References

1999 albums
BNA Records albums
Mindy McCready albums
Albums produced by Billy Joe Walker Jr.